Do Me Right is the debut studio album by American vocal group, The Detroit Emeralds, released in 1971 through Westbound Records.

Commercial performance
The album peaked at No. 23 on the R&B albums chart. It also reached No. 151 on the Billboard 200. The album features the title track, which peaked at No. 7 on the Hot Soul Singles chart and No. 43 on the Billboard Hot 100, and "Wear This Ring (with Love)", which charted at No. 18 on the Hot Soul Singles chart and No. 91 on the Billboard Hot 100.

Track listing

Personnel
Katouzzion – producer
Abrim Tilmon – arranger, conductor
Willie Mitchell – arranger, conductor

Charts
Album

Singles

References

External links

1971 debut albums
The Detroit Emeralds albums
Westbound Records albums